The Book of Aron is a historical fiction novel by Jim Shepard, published May 12, 2015 by Knopf Publishing Group.

Reception 
The Book of Aron received starred reviews from Kirkus, Library Journal, Shelf Awareness, and Booklist, as well as positive reviews from The Guardian, The Boston Globe, The New York Times Book Review, The Washington Post, NPR, The Seattle Times, The Toronto Star, and the Jewish Book Council.

Writing for Booklist, Donna Seaman noted, "Shepard’s magnificent tour de force will hold a prominent place in the literature of compassionate outrage."

Library Journal's Patrick Sullivan wrote, "Surrounded by devastation, hopelessness, and cruelty, [the main character] becomes an exemplar of all that is good and decent in the human spirit. Few will be able to read the last terrible, inspiring pages without tears in their eyes."

Publishers Weekly provided a mixed review stating, "Shepard is a master with a light touch—but against the backdrop of the Holocaust, maybe a bit too light. Although this novel paints an unflinching portrait of the ghetto, many characters seem to stand in for ideas, and the limp plot is propped up only by Shepard’s eye for detail."

Kirkus, The Washington Post, Buzzfeed, The San Francisco Chronicle, and Huffington Post named The Book of Aron one of the best fiction books of the year.

References 

Alfred A. Knopf books
2015 American novels
Novels set in Warsaw